Leucosyrinx turritus is a species of sea snail, a marine gastropod mollusk in the family Pseudomelatomidae, the turrids and allies.

Description

Distribution
This marine species has been found on the Naska & Sala-i-Gomes Ridges, Southeast Pacific

References

External links
 [Census of Marine Life (2012). SYNDEEP: Towards a first global synthesis of biodiversity, biogeography and ecosystem function in the deep sea. Unpublished data (datasetID: 59) http://www.comlsecretariat.org/wp-content/uploads/2010/06/SYNDEEP-Towards-a-first-global-synthesis-of-biodiversity-biogeography-and-ecosystem-function-in-the-deep-sea-Eva-Ramirez-Llodra-et-al..pdf]
 

turritus
Gastropods described in 1990